is a 1966 Japanese film directed by Seijun Suzuki. Filmmaker Kaneto Shindō adapted the script from the novel by Takashi Suzuki. The film has also screened under the titles Violence Elegy, Elegy to Violence, Elegy for a Quarrel and The Born Fighter at various film festivals and retrospectives.

Plot
Kiroku Nanbu (Hideki Takahashi) is a Catholic teenager attending a military-tooled middle school in 1935 Bizen, Okayama. Living in a boardinghouse, he is infatuated with his landlady's chaste daughter, Michiko (Junko Asano). Unable to express his feelings or quell his libido with masturbation, due to peer pressure, shyness, and Catholic guilt, Nanbu turns to the only outlet left available to him: crazed, brutal violence.

Taken under the wing of Turtle (Yûsuke Kawazu ), Nanbu is taught how to fight through an elaborate training regimen. He then joins a school gang, the OSMS. A conflict between gang leader Takuan (Mitsuo Kataoka) and Turtle ensues concluding with Nanbu's usurpation of OSMS leadership. Setting a more aggressive manifesto of actively breaking all school rules, and avoiding girls entirely, he has a run-in with the school drill sergeant and is suspended. Turtle speaks to the school administration on Nanbu's behalf resulting in both students fleeing Okayama, leaving Michiko behind.

Now living in the Aizuwakamatsu, Fukushima with his aunt and uncle Nanbu reenlists in school but is repulsed by his classmates' weakness. He forms a new group and heightened conflicts commence with a local gang. Michiko visits to say goodbye to Nanbu and tell him that she has decided to join a convent as she is unable to bear children. She is later waylaid by marching soldiers. Distraught to new heights, Nanbu spots a poster for (real life) radical, political activist, Ikki Kita (Hiroshi Midorigawa), whom he had met briefly in a tea house, and, reinvigorated, marches on to join in the events of Ni-niroku jiken.

Most of the film is done in a light-hearted, one would even say comic, vein, including sequences of martial arts combat. Innovative editing techniques (unusual "jump-cuts") are employed as well. But the mood shifts in the closing minutes, with the column of marching soldiers callously brushing past Michiko symbolizing the rising mood of militarism as the 1930s move on toward the Japanese atrocities in occupied Chinese territory and World War II itself. When Kiroku and a pal learn of the attempted coup in Tokyo (the February 26 Incident cited previously), they decide to head there to participate. On which side will they fight, the established order or the rebels? Readers of the novel will know, but not moviegoers, as the planned sequel failed to materialize.

Sequel
The events of the film cover only the first half of the novel on which it was based. Suzuki had planned, and co-written the script, for a sequel covering the latter half of the story but was fired after his next film, Branded to Kill, and the project entered development limbo. In the book Nanbu joins the army, goes on to fight in China and is killed.

Production
Fighting Elegy was directed by Seijun Suzuki for Nikkatsu. Suzuki actively encouraged Nikkatsu to purchase the rights to the novel by Takashi Suzuki. It was adapted by filmmaker Kaneto Shindō. Suzuki took many liberties with the script.

Cast
Hideki Takahashi - Kiroku Nanbu
Junko Asano - Michiko
Yûsuke Kawazu - Turtle
Mitsuo Kataoka - Takuan
Chikako Miyagi - Yoshino Nanbu
Isao Tamagawa - Principal of Kitakata J.H.S.
Keisuke Noro - Kaneda
Asao Sano
Hiroshi Midorigawa - Ikki Kita
Seijiro Onda - Kiroku’s father

References

Sources

External links
 
 
 
 Fighting Elegy  at the Japanese Movie Database
Fighting Elegy an essay by Tony Rayns at the Criterion Collection

1966 films
1966 drama films
Japanese black-and-white films
Films based on Japanese novels
Films directed by Seijun Suzuki
1960s Japanese-language films
Nikkatsu films
Films with screenplays by Kaneto Shindo
Films set in Okayama Prefecture
Films set in Fukushima Prefecture
1960s Japanese films